Trevor Martin Chappell (born 12 October 1952) is a former Australian cricketer, a member of the South Australian Chappell family which excelled at cricket. He played 3 tests and 20 One Day Internationals for Australia. He won the Sheffield Shield with New South Wales twice, and scored a century for Australia against India in the 1983 World Cup. His career was overshadowed, however, by an incident in 1981 in which he bowled an underarm delivery to New Zealand cricketer Brian McKechnie to stop the batsman from hitting a six.

After retiring from first class cricket in 1986, Chappell went on to become fielding coach for the Sri Lanka cricket team in 1996, and in 2001 became coach of the Bangladesh cricket team. He used to be the national coach of the Singapore cricket team.

Early life
Chappell was the youngest of the Chappell cricketing brothers, his two elder brothers being Ian and Greg, and the grandson of former Australian captain Vic Richardson. Chappell grew up playing cricket in the backyard with his brothers, and like them was coached by Lynn Foster and attended Prince Alfred College.

Greg Chappell later recalled, "I was going to be every bit the tyrant to Trevor that Ian had been to me. But TC was his own man. Trevor was quiet and unassuming, but if you pushed him too far, he'd explode. That's TC through and through: very passive most of the time, easy going, but push him too far and there's an explosion coming."

Chappell's childhood hero was Keith Miller. Throughout his early playing career he was a batsman, although his excellent fielding at cover also brought him attention. "I figured the cover region was the area where the ball went more often than not, so I thought it was a good spot to field", he later said. "It keeps you occupied and always in the game."

Over the summer of 1969/70 he toured the West Indies with the Australian Schoolboys XI, a team that also included Gary Gilmour, Gary Cosier and Ian Davis. During the tour he came down with chicken pox. He recovered to score 52 against St Kitts.

Chappell also played for South Australia in the Australian Schoolboys Cricket Council Championships in Sydney.

Early career

Early 1970s
Chappell debuted for South Australia in the 1972–73 season, replacing Ken Cunningham who had to drop out for business reasons. He later recalled:
When I first got picked for South Australia, Ian said, "You got to decide what sort of a player you want to be – whether you want to be an aggressive, attacking player, or more like a grafting sort of player." I had to think about that and that I'm not really a free hitter of the ball, so the choice I made was I was going to be more of a grafter.
His career began well, scoring 67 on debut. He made half-centuries in his next two games, but struggled thereafter and was eventually dropped from the South Australian side. Chappell:
When I first played for South Australia, I did all right. Then I got injured right at the start of the second season – I broke my nose and cheekbone in a fielding accident. I damaged my shoulder as well. I couldn't throw very well. Fielding has always been one of my main skills and I lost confidence in the fielding. I wasn't getting any runs, I wasn't bowling much in those days, and I wasn't fielding terribly well either. I ended up playing all of the first-class season and had a bad season. I still couldn't get runs in South Australia the following season but I'd go to England and get runs. I got dropped from the South Australian team.

1975: League cricket
In 1975 Chappell played for Walsden in the Central Lancashire Cricket League over the English summer. It was a highly successful season for Chappell, who found his medium pace bowling effective on English wickets. He ended up making 1,268 runs at an average of 52.8 and taking 106 wickets at an average of 14 – the first "double" of 1,000 runs and 100 wickets in the Central League since 1961.

1975–76: South Africa
Over the 1975–76 Australian summer Chappell toured South Africa as part of DH Robins XI, a special invitational side managed by Richie Benaud. Chappell's teammates included David Steele and Geoff Howarth. Chappell later said "I ... did all right" on the tour. Highlights included scoring 69 against Transvaal.

When he returned to South Australia at the end of the English season Chappell continued to play club cricket in Adelaide.

1976: England
He returned to England in 1976 and enjoyed another successful English summer in the Lancashire League, this time for East Lancashire.

1976–77: Western Australia
Chappell then received an offer to play for the Scarborough Cricket Club in Perth and moved to Western Australia. He had a run of strong games with scores of 48, 88, 43 and 76. This led to him playing four first class games for Western Australia in 1976–77, in which he scored two fifties at an average of 40.

1977: England
In 1977, he played for East Lancashire again in the Lancashire League.

World Series Cricket

1977–78
In the same year, Chappell signed to play for World Series Cricket along with his brothers. He had failed to make the first team for WA for the 1977–78 season when Dennis Lillee approached him. Chappell later recalled, "Lillee said to me, "Bad luck about not making it in the WA team. Don't worry, something better might come along." I had no idea what he meant. And a few days later [Austin] Robinson, Dennis' manager, rang and said, "Do you want to join World Series Cricket" and I said, "Yeah, where do I sign?""

Chappell played ten games for WSC Australia in the Country Cup in 1977–78, scoring 339 runs, more than any other Australian batsman, although his average was only 26.

A highlight was a 110 he scored against the West Indies in Albury. He also scored 56 off 300 minutes against a World XI in a Lismore game which resulted in him being booed by the crowd for slow scoring. "Trevor Chappell batted exceptionally well and he did not deserve the rubbishing the crowd gave him", said Australian captain Ross Edwards.

1978–79: World Series Cricket
Over the 1978–79 season Chappell mostly played for the WSC Cavaliers, a team of players of various nationalities who were not selected for the top three WSC teams, competing in the Cavaliers Cup.

"We had a whole mixture and nobody probably really wanted to be there", recalled Chappell. "They would rather be in the main games. We had some surprising results. We won a few games we probably weren't expected to."

Chappell enjoyed good form that season, which he partly attributed to the captaincy of Eddie Barlow. "Eddie once said to me early on in the series, 'You gotta stop trying to play like Ian or Greg and play like you. Just be Trevor.' That definitely helped me through World Series."

Chappell's highlights that season included 93 against the West Indies and 126, 96 and 72 against the World XI.

Chappell led the aggregates out of all players in the Country Tour, making 629 runs at an average of 33.1, including one century and four half centuries.

Australian XI selection and the West Indies
This form helped earn Chappell selection in the Australian XI one-day team for the International Cup that summer (he played in three games with a top score of 14) and also on the Australian XI in the West Indies in 1979.

In the West Indies Chappell was picked in the first four of the Supertests, but was unable to reprise his Australian form in the Caribbean, his highest score in the Test matches and One Day Internationals being 28. During the first Test he was struck in the face by a delivery from Andy Roberts and required stitches.

Post-WSC

1979–80: Move to New South Wales
When World Series Cricket ended in 1979, Chappell moved to Sydney and started playing for the club Gordon. He started off the season with 55 for a Rick McCosker XI against a Ross Edwards XI in a trial game. This ensured his selection in the New South Wales side for the first Sheffield Shield match that summer, meaning Chappell had now played for three states. He was preferred to non-WSC-aligned batsman John Dyson, which caused some controversy at the time.

Chappell was under pressure to justify his selection but responded with 150 against West Australia, helping New South Wales win. He later scored 144 against Tasmania 76 not out against Queensland and 80 against the touring English. Chappell started to bowl more, and his fielding by now was amongst the best in the country; he began to be discussed as an international prospect.

1980–81: One Day International Player
At the beginning of the 1980–81 summer, Chappell's bowling spell of 3–22 helped NSW defeat Queensland.

In November, Chappell was selected in the Australian one-day side against New Zealand. Australia lost the game. Chappell managed only 12 runs and took 0–21 with the ball. He did not bat or bowl in his second game.

Chappell was kept in the team to play India, taking 1–14 and scoring 14. His figures for his next game were 0–27 and 6, then 1–40, 2–42, 1–21, 14 and 14.

Chappell did not particularly impress with the bat that summer but his bowling and fielding were useful.

Chappell's early season Sheffield Shield form was poor but he recovered to score 111 against Queensland.

He was then selected to play in the Australian side for the third test against New Zealand, replacing Shaun Graf as 12th man. He had to make way for the next test when Graf returned from injury.

He was dropped from the one-day side to make way for Jim Higgs, but soon returned.

He managed to keep his place in the squad for the finals. In the second final Chappell took 2–21. He is most remembered for what happened in the third final.

Underarm incident

Chappell became infamous after bowling an underarm delivery when playing for Australia during a match against New Zealand in 1981.

The teams were contesting the third final of the Benson and Hedges World Series Cup. New Zealand needed to score six runs to tie the match. Not wanting to risk this, Greg Chappell, Australia's captain and Chappell's brother, asked Trevor Chappell how his underarm bowling was. When Trevor Chappell replied that he didn't know because he had never bowled underarm, Greg Chappell said, "well there is only one way to find out" and then Trevor Chappell rolled the ball along the ground to batsman Brian McKechnie.

Underarm bowling, allowed at the time by the rules of the series, but already outlawed at the time in England's domestic competition, is no longer permitted in games under the playing regulations directly controlled by the ICC. In terms of The Laws of Cricket (Law 24.1b), underarm bowling is permitted in other matches provided that the captains agree to it prior to the start of the match.

Although it was not universally illegal to bowl underarm at the time, it was widely accepted to be contrary to the spirit of the game. A visibly agitated McKechnie could do little but block the ball to avoid being dismissed, then throwing his bat away in disgust, and so Australia won the game. It was described as "the most disgusting incident I can recall in the history of cricket" by the then Prime Minister of New Zealand, Robert Muldoon.

Chappell played in the fourth final, taking 1–41.

Test Cricket

1981 Ashes
In February 1981, Ian Chappell listed his possible squad for the Ashes. He wrote "if another batsman is needed for any reason, then Trevor Chappell would be my selection because he can bat anywhere in the order and is the best cover field in Australia."

Trevor Chappell returned to Sheffield Shield making 71 against WA. This form, and his bowling and fielding, helped Chappell be selected on the squad to tour England for the 1981 Ashes.

Greg Chappell chose not to tour England in 1981, and there was much speculation over who would take his spot at number three in the batting line-up. During the early stages of the tour it was thought Martin Kent would take his place at number three, and Chappell only play one-dayers and tour games. However, Kent displayed poor form while Chappell was more consistent – 47 against Somerset and 91 against Gloucestershire.

As the tour went on, Chappell's form was not particularly good but Kent's was worse, and it was felt the other batsman, Dirk Wellham, was too inexperienced. Hence, Chappell was selected in the first Test.

"I'd never really expected to play Test cricket – three family members had already played, what were the chances of a fourth?" said Trevor Chappell. "Then I was involved in World Series Cricket, throw in the underarm and the odds were getting longer. So when it did happen, it was a great thrill."

Chappell's first innings saw him come in at number five with Graham Yallop at three. He made 17 runs over 122 minutes. In the second innings, he made 20 over 94 minutes, and hit the winning runs as Australia won by four wickets.

Chappell kept his place in the team for the second Test but failed twice, scoring 2 and 5. Despite this the selectors kept their faith, and Chappell was in the third Test side, promoted to number three.

This match passed into legend. Chappell scored 27 over 161 minutes, helping Australia to a first innings total of 401, notably taking part in a 94-run partnership with John Dyson. England were dismissed for 174, Kim Hughes enforced the follow-on, and at one stage England were 7–135 in response. Then Ian Botham began one of the most famous counter-attacks in Test cricket, scoring 149 not out and helping England reach 356. Chappell was never called upon to bowl. Australia had to score 130 to win. Chappell came to the wicket when Australia were 1–13 – he and Dyson took them to 56, with Chappell making 8 off 56 balls. He was then dismissed, which triggered a collapse; Australia lost the match by 18 runs.

The fighting quality of Chappell's innings had been noted, and it was not a foregone conclusion that he would be dropped. However, by this stage Martin Kent had rediscovered his form, and he was selected in the Australian eleven for the fourth Test, with Chappell made twelfth man.

Australia lost the fourth test and there was some media talk that Chappell might find his way back in the team for the fifth test in place of Graham Yallop, who had shown weakness against fast bowling. Chappell scored 46 in a tour game, but then it seemed the wicket for the fifth test would take spin, which Yallop excelled at playing, so he kept his spot and Chappell remained twelfth man.

Chappell then won a man-of-the-match award for hitting 63 in a one-day game against Leicestershire. However, Dirk Wellham was preferred to him in the sixth Test.

1981–82 summer
At the beginning of the 1981–82 summer, Chappell was still mentioned as a Test prospect. "Trevor Chappell cannot be left out of calculation", wrote one journalist. "He is resourceful, can bat early or late, bowls a penetrative medium pacer and fields brilliantly." However, Chappell never played Test cricket again. "Being on a tour that is not very successful probably damns your chances to get another go", he later reflected.

He did participate in a 219-run stand against Tasmania for NSW. He later took 4–35 against WA in a McDonald's Cup match, and in a crucial Sheffield Shield game against Victoria he took 4–12 and made 47 runs.

1982–83
Chappell began the following summer poorly when hit by a ball at training. He recovered, and went on to deliver a number of excellent performances for NSW, including 92 against South Australia, 61 against England, 89 against New Zealand in a one-day game and 132 against Queensland.

The highlight of Chappell's summer came during the Sheffield Shield final where his second innings effort of 4–45 was crucial in helping bowl New South Wales to victory. It was the state's first Shield in a long time.

He ended the season with 633 first class runs and 27 wickets.

1983 World Cup
Chappell's efforts over the summer resulted in a surprise selection for Australian's 1983 World Cup squad. He said at the time:
I thought I was in with a chance but I didn't want to build up my hopes. The way I worked it out, it was to be me or Ken MacLeay and I knew I had a few years experience on him, having played Tests and more Sheffield Shield. This is the biggest thrill apart from my 1981 Test selection in England and helping bring back the Sheffield Shield to NSW last year.
Ken Macleay ended up joining the squad anyway, when Jeff Thomson fell injured.

Chappell was made 12th man for Australia's early games.

He was selected for a game against India and promoted to opener – he responded by scoring 110. However, he found less success in later games and never played for Australia again after the tournament.

Chappell later recalled:
I preferred to open the batting or bat in the top order somewhere. But I probably wasn't good enough to bat at No. 3 or No. 4, which is why I was where I was – down at the bottom. It just depended if we had couple of good openers so I wasn't going to get a go there and at No. 3 or No. 4 or even at 5, 6, so 7 is where I got a go in the international side.

Later career

1983–84
A series of indifferent performances led to Chappell being dropped by New South Wales during the 1983–84 season. He was kept on in the one day team and scored 54 against the Australian Capital Territory.

1984–85
During the opening game of the 1984–85 season Chappell was again dropped from the NSW Shield team down to 12th man. However he was kept in the side for the McDonald's Cup. Injuries to players and national selection duties meant Chappell found himself back in the team. New South Wales ended up winning both the Sheffield Shield and the McDonald's Cup that season.

1985–86
During the 1985–86 summer, Chappell was suspended for two premiership matches in Sydney's grade competition for disputing an umpire's decision.

Later life
Chappell retired from first-class cricket in 1986; however, he continued to play grade cricket with the North Sydney cricket club, leading them to a premiership.
He went on to coach the Gordon Women's cricket club.

In 1987, he and Brian McKechnie reunited to play a double wicket game together in New Zealand.

He was a fielding coach for Sri Lanka from 1996 to 2000 and had a short stint as national coach for Bangladesh. "I’m lucky coaching came along because I couldn’t bear the thought of office work", he said later. He says coaching Bangladesh was a very rough job because of the language barrier. He was sacked as coach of Bangladesh in April 2002 after the team lost ten out of its first eleven Tests.

In 2003, Chappell, along with his brothers, were honoured by the South Australian Cricket Association when a new stand in the Adelaide Oval was named the Chappell Stand after the cricketing brothers.

Chappell then became coach of the 1st XI cricket team at The King's School, Parramatta over the Australian summer. He also began coaching the Singapore National Cricket Team. In 2006, he also participated in a game to celebrate former teammate Robert Holland's 60th birthday, as well as Greg Matthews, David Gilbert, Rick McCosker and Greg Dyer at Toronto NSW.

From July to September 2009, he undertook a 50-day stint as coach of Singapore for its ICC World Cricket League Division 6 tournament, held in Singapore.

In 2013, he said about coaching in Singapore that "I have never had my best 11 together during a training session. It is very disjointed and players offer excuses not to train, some of which are probably not legitimate. The players are amateur, so there isn’t always the motivation to come to training. The work schedule is long and players can’t leave work early for cricket here. So, as coach it means having to do things over and over again because we can’t get guys together." "I wouldn’t mind being more involved with helping the New South Wales juniors", he said. "Unfortunately, the cricket associations seem to look at players from the 1970s and ‘80s as from a bygone era. I have tried a few times to get a more prominent gig in Australia but it never progressed anywhere."

Personal life
Chappell married Lorraine Gavin in Canberra in 1981; Graeme Watson was his best man.

"There is not a lot non-cricketing that I have done really", he said in a later interview. "I'm not married and don't have any kids, so that is a very short story. I was married, shortly after the underarm actually, in March 1981 and then divorced before the 1980s had finished."

References

External links

1952 births
Living people
Australian cricketers
Australia One Day International cricketers
Australia Test cricketers
Trevor
Cricketers at the 1983 Cricket World Cup
Cricketers from Adelaide
New South Wales cricketers
People educated at Prince Alfred College
South Australia cricketers
Western Australia cricketers
World Series Cricket players
D. H. Robins' XI cricketers
Coaches of the Bangladesh national cricket team
Australian expatriates in Bangladesh